Morimidius flavosparsus is a species of beetle in the family Cerambycidae, and the only species in the genus Morimidius. It was described by Stephan von Breuning in 1939.

It's 10.5–13 mm long and 3.5–5 mm wide, and its type locality is the Mishmi Hills, Assam.

References

Morimopsini
Beetles described in 1939
Taxa named by Stephan von Breuning (entomologist)